Montevideo was a Holsteiner horse ridden by Uwe Sauer for West Germany in international level dressage competitions between 1983 and 1992.

Montevideo and Sauer competed in the 1983 European Championships, where they took an individual bronze and helped the West German team to back-to-back team golds in the 1983 and 1985 European Championships. The pair also competed at the 1984 Olympics in Los Angeles, where they took a team gold and 6th individually. Other major accomplishments include a team gold and an individual silver at the 1984 German Championships and an individual silver at the 1985 German Championships.

Pedigree

References

Dressage horses
Horses in the Olympics
1971 animal births